Kirkuk Sports Club is a football club based in Kirkuk, Iraq. The team plays in Iraq Division Three.

Kirkuk participated in the Iraqi Premier League for the first time in 1983–84, but was relegated for several seasons to the lower divisions, before returning to the top-flight seasons later. They won the Iraq Division One in 2000–01.

History 
Kikruk Sports Club was founded as Wahid Huzairan in 1977. In 1991 the club changed its name to Kirkuk.

Honours
Iraq Division One
Winners (2): 1982–83, 2000–01

References

External links
 Club's page on Goalzz.com

Kirkuk
1947 establishments in Iraq
1977 establishments in Iraq
Football clubs in Kirkuk